Bríd Dixon (born 13 February 1893) was an Irish nationalist and republican who was one of the women in the GPO during the Easter Rising of 1916.

Early life
Born Bridget Angela Dixon to Henry Dixon and Mary Gillis of Phibsborough, Dublin. Her father was a nationalist and a solicitors clerk. Dixon was educated in Irish at the instruction of her father. She then attended Muckross Park Dominican Convent in Donnybrook. Dixon and her sisters attended Irish College in Ballingeary on several occasions. Dixon was a member of the Keating Branch of the Gaelic League. As with many others Dixon then joined the Cumann na mBan's Central branch. She took part in the usual activities, learning first aid and marching at major events like the O'Donovan Rossa funeral.
Dixon was a founder member of Na bAisteoiri - a Dramatic Society for the production of plays in the Irish Language. It later became the Comhar Dramuiochta.

Revolution
The weekend before the Easter Rising Dixon's father sent her out of the city. However her brother cycled out to her to let her know where she was to report on the Monday. Dixon assisted Brigid Foley deliver money in safety but with the confusion during the week, for the first few days Dixon and those with her were not much used. By midweek they had made it into town and during the fighting they made their way into the General Post Office (GPO). In fact Dixon was with Leslie Price. They had determined that they were going to make it down to O'Connell Street to the Post office. They were given separate jobs once they arrived.

Initially Dixon worked for Louise Gavan Duffy in the kitchen upstairs. On Wednesday she was sent out as a messenger with ammunition for Father Mathew Hall in Church Street with Price. The two were often sent with dispatches together. Other activities she was put to was the copying out of instructions to various leaders. Eventually with the main group of women in the GPO they were evacuated from the building. Only a small number of women remained with the men. Although questioned by the soldiers and unable to go home until the hostilities were completely over, Dixon was not arrested or imprisoned.

Dixon married Bernard E. Fee, an engineering draughtsman on 12 August 1931.

Further reading

References

1893 births
Irish republicans
Women in war 1900–1945
Women in war in Ireland
People of the Easter Rising
Year of death missing